The 2018 New South Wales Waratahs season was the club's 22nd season since the inception of Super Rugby in 1996.

Squad

Current squad

The squad for the 2018 season:

Transfers

In:

Out:

Season summary

Season results

Standings

Finals

Statistics

References

External links
 Waratahs Official website
 Australia Super Rugby website
 SANZAR website

2018
2018 Super Rugby season by team
2018 in Australian rugby union